Karya Bagang, born on 20 March 1977, is an Indian politician from the state of Arunachal Pradesh.

Smt Bagang was elected  from Chayangtajo seat starting the 2009 Arunachal Pradesh Legislative Assembly election and 2014 Arunachal Pradesh Legislative Assembly election , standing as an Indian National Congress candidate. On 23 Oct 2009 Karya Bagang, became a first Lady MLA from Chayangtajo constituency. She is one of the two female MLAs from Arunachal Pradesh. Smt Gum Tayeng from Dambuk is the other one.

See also
Arunachal Pradesh Legislative Assembly

References

External links
 Karya Bagang profile
 Karya Bagang FB

1977 births
People's Party of Arunachal politicians
Indian National Congress politicians
Living people
Arunachal Pradesh MLAs 2009–2014
Arunachal Pradesh MLAs 2014–2019